6-Methylsalicylic acid is an organic compound with the formula CH3C6H3(CO2H)(OH). It is a white solid that is soluble in basic water and in polar organic solvents. At neutral pH, the acid exists as 6-methylsalicylate  Its  functional groups include a carboxylic acid and a phenol group.  It is one of four isomers of methylsalicylic acid.

It occurs naturally, being a biosynthetic precursor to m-cresol. Its decarboxylation is catalyzed by 6-methylsalicylate decarboxylase:
6-methylsalicylate  3-cresol + CO2

See also
 4-Methylsalicylic acid
 3-Methylsalicylic acid

References 

Salicylic acids